Cajal is a small lunar impact crater on the northern part of the Mare Tranquilitatis. It was named after the Spanish doctor and Nobel laureate Santiago Ramón y Cajal. It is a circular (9 km diameter), cup-shaped formation that lies southeast of the lava-inundated crater Jansen. Cajal was formerly designated Jansen F.  Also to the northwest is a system of wrinkle ridges designated the Dorsa Barlow.

References

External links
 LTO-61A1 Cajal — L&PI topographic map

Impact craters on the Moon